Reflexivity might mean:

 Reflexivity (grammar)
 Reflexivity (social theory)
 Self-reflexivity (see Self-reference)

See also
 
 Reflectivism
 Reflexive (disambiguation)
 Reflexive operator algebra
 Reflexive pronoun
 Reflexive relation
 Reflexive space
 Reflexive verb
 Sesquilinear form